The Drowning may refer to:
The Drowning (video game), a 2013 video game
The Drowning EP, by Dashboard Confessional
The Drowning (novel), a 2008 novel by Camilla Läckberg
The Drowning (film), a 2016 American-Hong Kong thriller drama film directed by Bette Gordon
The Drowning (TV Series), a 2021 British four-part television thriller drama series directed by Carolina Giammetta.

See also
Drowning (disambiguation)